Terry Jones (1942–2020) was a Welsh comedian, writer, director and actor.

Terry Jones may also refer to:
Terry David Jones (1938–2014), Canadian politician
Terry Jones (i-D) (born 1945), co-founder of i-D magazine
Terry Jones (ice hockey) (born 1946), Canadian retired professional ice hockey player
Terry Jones (journalist) (born 1948), Canadian sports journalist
Terry Jones (pastor) (born 1951), American Christian pastor
Terry Jones (defensive tackle) (born 1956), former NFL defensive tackle
Terry Jones (born 1970), American singer and founding member of  Point of Grace
Terry Jones (baseball) (born 1971), former professional baseball player
Terry Jones (racing driver) (born 1971), Canadian racing driver
Terry Jones (tight end) (born 1979), former NFL tight end
Terry Jones (businessman) (fl. 1970s–2020s), founder and former CEO of Travelocity.com
Terry Jones, singer and founding member of Pagan Altar